Tregroes ("Settlement of the Cross") is a hamlet in the  community of Llandysul, Ceredigion, Wales, which is 64.1 miles (103.2 km) from Cardiff and 183.6 miles (295.5 km) from London. Tregroes is represented in the Senedd by Elin Jones (Plaid Cymru) and is part of the Ceredigion constituency in the House of Commons.

See also
D. Jacob Davies
T. Llew Jones
List of localities in Wales by population

References

Villages in Ceredigion
Llandysul